Thorwald Veneberg (born 16 October 1977, in Amsterdam) is a Dutch former professional road bicycle racer. He rode for UCI ProTeam Rabobank between 2001 and 2007.

Major results

1998
Tour de Normandie
1st Stages 3 & 7
1999
1st Stage 3 Circuito Montañés
 3rd Road race, National Under–23 Road Championships
6th Hel van Het Mergelland
2000
4th Overall Circuit de Lorraine
1st Stage 3
2002
1st Mountains Classification Sachsen Tour 
2004
1st Noord-Nederland Tour
2005
1st Scheldeprijs
7th Clásica de Almería

External links 
Profile at Rabobank official website

1977 births
Living people
Dutch male cyclists
Cyclists from Amsterdam
UCI Road World Championships cyclists for the Netherlands